Tan Choo Leng is a Singaporean lawyer and the wife of former Prime Minister Goh Chok Tong.

Early life and career
Tan graduated from the University of Singapore (now the National University of Singapore) with Bachelor of Laws degree. She is currently an advocate and solicitor for M/s Wong Partnership.

Controversy
She has given her support to many charities, and was best known for being a patron of the National Kidney Foundation (NKF). 

During the 2005 NKF scandal, she commented that the annual salary of S$600,000 drawn by NKF's chief executive officer T. T. Durai was considered "peanuts" as compared to the hundreds of millions of dollars managed by the NKF. Her remark was subsequently met with negative reactions from many Singaporeans.

Tan stepped down as a patron after Durai and the NKF's board of directors resigned under public pressure on 14 July 2005. Prime Minister Goh Chok Tong later told the press that his wife regretted making that comment.

References

Year of birth missing (living people)
Living people
Singaporean women lawyers
Spouses of prime ministers of Singapore
National University of Singapore alumni
Singaporean people of Chinese descent
20th-century Singaporean lawyers
20th-century women lawyers
21st-century Singaporean lawyers
21st-century women lawyers